Georgy Grigorevich Mondzolevski (born January 26, 1934) is a Soviet former volleyball player who competed for the Soviet Union in the 1964 Summer Olympics and in the 1968 Summer Olympics.

Career
He is Jewish, and was born in Orsha  Dr. George Eisen of Nazareth College included Shary on his list of Jewish Olympic Medalists.

He won the Soviet championship with Burevestnik Odessa in 1956 and with CSKA Moskva (1958, 1960–1963, 1965, and 1966). Also with CSKA Moskva, he twice won the European Champions’ League title (1960 and 1962).

He played in all nine matches during the Soviet team's gold medal performances at the 1964 Summer Olympics and 1968 Summer Olympics.

He also won two World Championships with the Soviet team (1960 and 1962) and the European Championships title in 1967.

After his volleyball career, he taught as a professor at the Moscow State Mining University.

See also
List of select Jewish volleyball players

References

External links
 

1934 births
Living people
People from Orsha
Soviet men's volleyball players
Belarusian men's volleyball players
Ukrainian men's volleyball players
Olympic volleyball players of the Soviet Union
Volleyball players at the 1964 Summer Olympics
Volleyball players at the 1968 Summer Olympics
Olympic gold medalists for the Soviet Union
Olympic medalists in volleyball
Jewish volleyball players
Soviet Jews
Jewish Belarusian sportspeople
Jewish Ukrainian sportspeople
Medalists at the 1968 Summer Olympics
Medalists at the 1964 Summer Olympics
Burevestnik (sports society) athletes
K. D. Ushinsky South Ukrainian National Pedagogical University alumni
Sportspeople from Vitebsk Region